Iberopria is an extinct genus of wasp currently comprising a single species Iberopria perialla.

References

Parasitica
†Iberopria
Prehistoric Hymenoptera genera
Monotypic Hymenoptera genera
Taxa named by Michael S. Engel